Hirono (written: 広野) is a Japanese surname. Notable people with the surname include:

, Japanese snowboarder
Mazie Hirono (born 1947), American politician
, Japanese footballer
, Japanese academic
Takeyasu Hirono (born 1971), Japanese mixed martial artist

Japanese-language surnames